John Fletcher Driggs (March 8, 1813 – December 17, 1877) was a politician from the U.S. state of Michigan.

Driggs was born in Kinderhook, New York. He completed preparatory studies and moved with his parents to Tarrytown, New York, in 1825. He moved to New York City in 1827, where he was an apprentice, journeyman, and master mechanic in the trade of sash, door, and blind manufacturing, 1829–1856. He was superintendent of the New York penitentiary and public institutions on Blackwells Island in 1844

Driggs moved to Michigan in 1856 and engaged in the real-estate business and salt manufacturing. He was president of the common council of East Saginaw, Michigan, in 1858. He was a member of the Michigan House of Representatives, 1859–1860. He was tendered an appointment as colonel during the Civil War and organized the Twenty-ninth Michigan Infantry, July 29, 1864.

Driggs was elected as a Republican becoming the first person to represent Michigan's 6th congressional district to the 38th, 39th, and 40th Congresses, serving from March 4, 1863 to March 3, 1869. He was one of the committee members appointed to accompany the body of President Abraham Lincoln to Springfield, Illinois, for interment.

Driggs was injured by a fall on the ice in the winter of 1875–1876, as a result of which he died in East Saginaw. He was interred in Brady Hill Cemetery, Saginaw and was re-interred in Forest Lawn Cemetery in Saginaw.

References
 Retrieved on 2008-02-14
The Political Graveyard

19th-century American politicians
1813 births
1877 deaths
John Fletcher
Republican Party members of the Michigan House of Representatives
People from Kinderhook, New York
Politicians from Saginaw, Michigan
Republican Party members of the United States House of Representatives from Michigan
Union Army colonels
Military personnel from Michigan